Egypt has submitted films for consideration for the Academy Award for Best International Feature Film since 1958, when Youssef Chahine's Cairo Station became both the first African and the first Arab film to contend for the award.

The Foreign Film award is handed out annually by the United States Academy of Motion Picture Arts and Sciences to a feature-length motion picture produced outside the United States that contains primarily non-English dialogue. The award was created for the 1956 Academy Awards, succeeding the non-competitive Honorary Academy Awards which were presented between 1947 and 1955 to the best foreign language films released in the United States.

Egypt has submitted thirty-six films to the Foreign Oscar competition but has never yet achieved a coveted Oscar nomination. They virtually disappeared from the competition during the sixteen-year period between 1982 and 2001 (sending a total of three films), but returned as a regular participant in 1999. Youssef Chahine represented Egypt four times, more than any other director.

Submissions
The Academy of Motion Picture Arts and Sciences has invited the film industries of various countries to submit their best film for the Academy Award for Best Foreign Language Film since 1956. The Foreign Language Film Award Committee oversees the process and reviews all the submitted films. Following this, they vote via secret ballot to determine the five nominees for the award. Below is a list of the films that have been submitted by Egypt for review by the academy for the award by year.

Submissions between 1958 and 1960 were submitted under the name of the United Arab Republic, which was the formal name of Egypt at the time.

All films were in Arabic.

The Egyptian Academy has been known in recent years for choosing topical films that are controversial at home. Coptic Christians launched an unsuccessful court case against 2004 submission I Love Cinema while dozens of Egyptian parliamentarians and a number of Muslim clerics similarly tried to ban The Yacoubian Building for depicting its depictions of Islamic fundamentalism and particularly homosexuality. 2002's Secret of the Young Girl a drama about teenage pregnancy, and 2003's Sleepless Nights, an examination of sex, divorce and relationships inside and outside of marriage also courted controversy among conservatives in Egypt.

In 2022, Egypt's Oscar Selection Committee announced a shortlist of five films: The Crime by Sherif Arafa, Full Moon by Hadi El Bagoury, Kira & El Gin by Marwan Hamed, 2 Talaat Harb by Magdy Ahmed Ali and Villa 19-B by Ahmad Abdalla., although Ahmed Ali withdrew his film prior to the vote. On 29 September, it was announced that a majority of the selection committee voted not to enter any of the shortlisted films.

See also
List of Academy Award winners and nominees for Best International Feature Film
List of Academy Award-winning foreign language films

Notes

References

External links
The Official Academy Awards Database
The Motion Picture Credits Database
IMDb Academy Awards Page

Egypt
Academy Award